Gullik Madsen Røed (17 February 1786 –  9 August 1857) was a Norwegian soldier and farmer. He served as a representative at the Norwegian Constitutional Assembly during 1814.

Gullik Madsen Røed was born at the farm Rød in Botne at Holmestrand in Vestfold, Norway where his father was a farmer. Around 1812, he took over the farm Bo in Sande in Vestfold.   He was also commander in the Sandeske  Company of  Telemark Infantry Regiment (  Telemarkske infanteriregiment).

He represented Telemark Regiment at the Norwegian Constituent Assembly at Eidsvoll in 1814. There he joined the independence party (Selvstendighetspartiet). He was later elected to represent Jarlsberg and Larvik in the Norwegian Parliament in 1836 and served with the Parliament from 1836 to 1837. He was a member of the committee on military affairs. (
In 1813, he married  Maren Bentsdatter Bøe (1791-1874) Together they were the parents of eight children,

References

Related Reading
Holme Jørn (2014) De kom fra alle kanter - Eidsvollsmennene og deres hus  (Oslo: Cappelen Damm) 

1786 births
1857 deaths
People from Holmestrand
Norwegian Army personnel
Norwegian military personnel of the Napoleonic Wars
Fathers of the Constitution of Norway